Philip Sutton may refer to:

 Philip Sutton (badminton) (born 1960), Welsh badminton player
 Philip Sutton (artist) (born 1928), British artist
 Philip R. N. Sutton (1915–1995), Australian dental researcher